"Money Trees" is a song by American rapper Kendrick Lamar, taken from his major label debut studio album Good Kid, M.A.A.D City (2012). The song, which appears as the fifth track on the album, features a guest appearance from his Black Hippy cohort, fellow American rapper Jay Rock. The song, produced by DJ Dahi, entered the Billboard Bubbling Under Hot 100 chart at number 19 due to high downloads, following the album's release. The song, mixed by Top Dawg engineer Derek "MixedByAli" Ali, features background vocals from American singer Anna Wise of Sonnymoon. Money Trees samples the Beach House song "Silver Soul," from their 2010 album Teen Dream, as well as vocals from Kendrick’s "Cartoon and Cereal" and interpolates lyrics from E-40’s "Big Ballin’ With My Homies".

On June 2, 2015, Jay Rock released the sequel  "Money Trees Deuce" as a solo record with no feature from Kendrick Lamar.

Background 
"Money Trees" follows the storyline of Good Kid, M.A.A.D City, as Kendrick Lamar reassesses what happened so far in the story. He talks about having sex with his love interest Sherane and going to tell his friends about it. He also assesses his current situation in his hometown Compton, California and reflecting on the immortalization of his uncle after he was shot. At the end of the track Lamar's mom calls him again and asks him to bring her car back, a recurring theme of the story. His dad has forgotten about the Domino's pizza he wanted by now, suggesting that Lamar "has been out of the house for a while, driving around and trying to figure his life out, having just been attacked outside Sherane’s house."

Music video 
On August 28, 2013, Taj Stansberry revealed that he had begun to shoot a music video with Lamar and Jay Rock for "Money Trees". Stansberry, who called the song his favorite song on the album, said upon getting the job to come up with a treatment for the video that was due in a day, he dropped everything right then, and created a website for the idea to present to Lamar. He added: "I started literally at 9 in the morning and finished at 9 at night."

Live performances 
Lamar performed "Money Trees", alongside Jay Rock at the BET Experience concert at the Staples Center in Los Angeles. The duo also frequently performed the track on Lamar's Good Kid, m.A.A.d city world tour and at the 2013 South by Southwest music festival. On October 15, 2013, Lamar and Jay Rock performed "Money Trees" at the 2013 BET Hip Hop Awards. On July 4, 2016, Lamar performed "Money Trees" at President Obama's Fourth of July BBQ.

Critical reception 
The song was met with acclaim from music critics, and it is widely regarded as one of Lamar’s best songs. XXL in their perfect "XXL" review, deemed the song a "tale of hustler's ambitions." In 2021, Rolling Stone ranked the track at number one on its list of “The 50 Best Kendrick Lamar Songs.” A similar 2017 list by Complex placed it fifth on their list of “The Best Kendrick Lamar Songs,” while The Guardian had it sixth on its 2022 list of “Kendrick Lamar’s 20 greatest songs – ranked!” 

The track especially received acclaim for the guest verse from Jay Rock. Complex praised Jay Rock's verse, calling it the tenth best guest appearance of 2012. They described his verse as "stellar", adding in the verse Rock "contemplates a life of crime versus one stricken in dire poverty." XXL included the verse on its 2019 list of the “35 of the Most Iconic Hip-Hop Guest Verses Since 2000,” stating that Rock “grounds the tune with a voice wizened by poverty and pushed by pursuit.”

Commercial performance 
Even without being released as a single, the song spent seven weeks on the US charts and peaked at number 19 on the US Billboard Bubbling Under Hot 100 Singles chart.

Charts

Weekly charts

Year-end charts

Certifications

References 

2013 songs
Kendrick Lamar songs
Songs written by Kendrick Lamar
Gangsta rap songs
Jay Rock songs
Songs written by DJ Dahi
Songs written by Jay Rock
Songs written by Victoria Legrand